The 1976–77 Oregon Webfoots men's basketball team represented the University of Oregon during the 1976–77 NCAA men's college basketball season.

Schedule

400th win at McArthur Court versus San Francisco State

Personnel
Greg Ballard
Rob Closs
Mike Drummond
Ernie Kent
Kelvin Small

References

Oregon Ducks men's basketball seasons
Oregon
Oregon
Oregon
Oregon